Dai-Kang Yang (a.k.a. ; born January 17, 1987, Taitung City, Taitung County, Taiwan; previously known as Yang Chung-shou or Chung-Shou Yang 陽仲壽) is a Taiwanese professional baseball outfielder for the High Point Rockers of the Atlantic League of Professional Baseball. He previously played in Nippon Professional Baseball (NPB) for the Hokkaido Nippon-Ham Fighters and Yomiuri Giants.

Career

Nippon Ham Fighters
The Hokkaido Nippon-Ham Fighters of Nippon Professional Baseball selected Yang in the first round of the 2006 NPB Draft. Yang was called up to the Fighters from the   reserve team on April 19, 2007.

Yang is a two-time Nippon Professional Baseball All-Star Series Game MVP, winning the honour in Game 3 of 2012 and Game 2 of 2014.

Yang has won the Nippon Professional Baseball Gold Glove Award twice in 2012 and 2013.

2013 was the best season of Yang's career, where he batted  along with 18 homeruns, 67 RBIs, and a league-leading 47 stolen bases.

At the end of the 2016 season after helping the Fighters to victory in the Pacific League and Japan Series, Yoh elected for free agency.

Yomiuri Giants

On 14 December 2016 it was announced that Yang would be joining the Yomiuri Giants.

Lake Country DockHounds
On February 23, 2022, Yang signed with the Lake Country DockHounds of the American Association of Professional Baseball. He played in 79 games for the DockHounds, slashing .260/.357/.432 with 9 home runs, 35 RBI, and 7 stolen bases. On February 14, 2023, Yang was released by Lake Country.

High Point Rockers
On March 6, 2023, Yang signed with the High Point Rockers of the Atlantic League of Professional Baseball.

International career
Yang played for the Chinese Taipei national baseball team at the 2006 World Baseball Classic. He went 0 for 3 with two strikeouts as the backup SS to Chin-Lung Hu.

In the 2006 Intercontinental Cup, Yang batted  and scored 9 runs, tying Michel Enriquez and Yulieski Gourriel for the tournament lead.

Yang was 1 for 1 for Taiwan in the 2007 Asian Championship, backing up Tai-Shan Chang at third base.

Yang batted 4-for-12 with a home run and four RBI in the first round of the 2013 World Baseball Classic. Yang was the Most Valuable Player of Pool B.

And also, on November 16, 2018, he was selected Yomiuri Giants roster at the 2018 MLB Japan All-Star Series exhibition game against MLB All-Stars.

Personal
Yang is the brother of Yao-Hsun Yang, a cousin of Chih-Yuan Chen and a nephew of Tai-Shan Chang. He is also related more distantly to Chien-Fu Yang, Cheng-Wei Chang and Sen Yang.

References

External links

Dai-Kang Yang at NPB Official Website
Facebook:陽岱鋼
https://npb.jp/bis/eng/players/21825112.html

1987 births
Living people
Amis people
Asian Games gold medalists for Chinese Taipei
Asian Games medalists in baseball
Baseball players at the 2006 Asian Games
Hokkaido Nippon-Ham Fighters players
Medalists at the 2006 Asian Games
Nippon Professional Baseball outfielders
Place of birth missing (living people)
Taiwanese expatriate baseball players in Japan
Yomiuri Giants players
2006 World Baseball Classic players
2013 World Baseball Classic players
2015 WBSC Premier12 players
People from Taitung County
Brisbane Bandits players
Taiwanese expatriate baseball players in Australia